Belterra is a  unincorporated community and census-designated place (CDP) in Hays County, Texas, United States. It was first listed as a CDP in the 2020 census with a population of 6,170.

Belterra is located in ZIP code 78737, an Austin mailing address. The CDP is bordered by Highway 290 on the north side, Mesa Verde Drive and Sand Hills Lane to the south, Sawyer Ranch Road to the west, and Nutty Brown Road to the east.  Belterra is located in the Dripping Springs Independent School District. Belterra is located in the Extra Territorial Jurisdiction (ETJ) of the city of Dripping Springs.

References

External links
  Belterra Community Website

Census-designated places in Hays County, Texas
Census-designated places in Texas